Luleå Airport  is located about 7 km (4.3 mi) south-southeast of Luleå, Sweden, near the village of Kallax. The airport had a total of 1,177,443 passengers in 2015, and is thus Sweden's fifth largest airport. It is the largest airport in northern Sweden (Norrland). The runway is also used by the Norrbotten Wing (F 21).

History
The airport began as the military airfield Norrbotten Wing (F 21) in 1941 and later opened up to civilian traffic to Stockholm on September 11, 1944. Winter operations began in 1948 when a hangar was built and runway lights were operational. International tourist charters started in 1969. The present terminal building was opened in 1984. The number of passengers increased a lot in the 1980s and then decreased much in the 1990s, both here and in all of Sweden, reached one million at Luleå in 1991, a figure which was reached again 2011. The passenger figures have still been fairly steady at Luleå since other transport modes and other airports are less attractive when going to Luleå. In 1999 the runway at Luleå Airport was extended to 3,350 meters for cargo flights, but that has not led to an increase in traffic; the airport authority attributes the lack of growth to the economy.

Airlines and destinations

Passenger

Cargo

Statistics

See also
 List of the largest airports in the Nordic countries

References

External links

Airports in Sweden
Buildings and structures in Norrbotten County
Luleå
Airports established in 1941
1941 establishments in Sweden
International airports in Sweden